Osumare are a group who play modern African music.  	
 
Osumare means rainbow in the Yoruba language from West Nigeria. Just like the colors of the rainbow the band combine different African music together to form their music which they call Osumare Beats.  Osumare Beats combines African roots music with fine instrumentation and diverse lyrics delivered with a  performance that always hold fans spellbound.

Osumare performs in concert halls all over Europe and also in great literature events like the readings of Professor Wole Soyinka (Nobel Prize Winner) in Germany.
Osumare music has been described by the African Courier as an African Music Ambassador group. According to the review in the African Courier, Osumare Music is unique as all the songs on their new CD carry thoughtful messages, and are very danceable.
Osumare music is a creative mix of African root percussion rhythms and chants, Afro jazz, juju music, highlife and Afro-beats.

See also 

Oxumaré

External links 
 Information on Osumare Beats

Nigerian world music groups